The montane Atlantic Forest rat (Delomys collinus) is a South American rodent species of the family Cricetidae. It is endemic to part of the Atlantic Forest region of southeastern Brazil, where it is found at elevations from 1000 to 2700 m in noncontiguous mountain ranges. Its karyotype, like that of closely related Delomys dorsalis, has 2n = 82, but the fundamental numbers of the two species differ. While it is not thought to be in present danger of extinction, habitat destruction and grassland fires are considered to be threats.

References

Delomys
Mammals of Brazil
Endemic fauna of Brazil
Mammals described in 1917
Taxa named by Oldfield Thomas